Mashhad, also spelled Mashad, is the second-most-populous city in Iran, located in the relatively remote north-east of the country about  from Tehran. It serves as the capital of Razavi Khorasan Province and has a population about 3,400,000 (2016 census), which includes the areas of Mashhad Taman and Torqabeh.

The city has been governed by different ethnic groups over the course of its history. Mashhad was once a major oasis along the ancient Silk Road connecting with Merv to the east. It enjoyed relative prosperity in the Mongol period. The city is named after the shrine of Imam Reza, the eighth Shia Imam, who was buried in a village in Khorasan which afterward gained the name, meaning the "place of martyrdom". Every year, millions of pilgrims visit the Imam Reza shrine. The Abbasid caliph Harun al-Rashid is also buried within the same shrine.

Mashhad is also known colloquially as the city of Ferdowsi, after the Iranian poet who composed the Shahnameh. The city is the hometown of some of the most significant Iranian literary figures and artists, such as the poet Mehdi Akhavan-Sales, and Mohammad-Reza Shajarian, the traditional Iranian singer and composer. Ferdowsi and Akhavan-Sales are both buried in Tus, an ancient city that is considered to be the main origin of the current city of Mashhad. On 30 October 2009 (the anniversary of Imam Reza's martyrdom), Iran's then-President Mahmoud Ahmadinejad declared Mashhad to be "Iran's spiritual capital".

History

Etymology and early history

Ancient Greek sources mention the passage and residence of Alexander the Great in this land, which was called "Susia", in 330 BC. The map of Tabula Peutingeriana, which dates back to the early Roman era, names this city on the west of Merv, Alexandria, instead of Susia. Pliny the Elder, says there is a city in the middle of Parthia, near Arsace and Nisiaea, called "Alexandropolis" after its founder. Many Muslim historians, from the 10th to the 16th century AD, attribute the founding of "Sanaabad" (the old name of the city) to Alexander. Also in the Shia hadith sources, which the narrators connect to the 7th to 9th centuries AD, there are quotations that Imam Ridha and Harun al-Rashid are buried in a city founded by "The righteous servant, The two-horned one", which title that known for Alexander the Great.

The older name of Mashhad is Sanaabad (سناباد). It was eventually renamed to Mashhad during the Safavid Empire. The name Mashhad comes from Arabic, meaning a martyrium. It is also known as the place where Ali ar-Ridha (Persian, Imam Reza), the eighth Imam of Shia Muslims, died (according to the Shias, was martyred). Reza's shrine was placed there.

The ancient Parthian city of Patigrabanâ, mentioned in the Behistun inscription (520 BCE) of the Achaemenid Emperor Darius I, may have been located at the present-day Mashhad.

There was a summer palace of Humayd ibn Qahtaba, the governor of Khurasan. In 808, when Harun al-Rashid, Abbasid caliph, was passing through to quell the insurrection of Rafi ibn al-Layth in Transoxania, he became ill and died. He was buried under the palace of Humayd ibn Qahtaba. Thus the Dar al-Imarah was known as the Mausoleum of Haruniyyeh. In 818, Ali al-Ridha was martyred by al-Ma'mun and was buried beside the grave of Harun.

Mongolian invasion: Ilkhanates
Although some believe that after this event, the city was called Mashhad al-Ridha (the place of martyrdom of al-Ridha), it seems that Mashhad, as a place-name, first appears in al-Maqdisi, i.e., in the last third of the 10th century. About the middle of the 14th century, the traveller Ibn Battuta uses the expression "town of Mashhad al-Rida". Towards the end of the Middle Ages, the name Nuqan, which is still found on coins in the first half of the 14th century under the Il-Khanids, seems to have been gradually replaced by al-Mashhad or Mashhad.

Shias began to make pilgrimages to his grave. By the end of the 9th century, a dome was built above the grave, and many other buildings and bazaars sprang up around it. Over the course of more than a millennium, it has been destroyed and rebuilt several times. In 1161, however, the Seljuks seized the city, but they spared the sacred area their pillaging. Mashad al-Ridha was not considered a "great" city until Mongol raids in 1220, which caused the destruction of many large cities in Khurasan but leaving Mashhad relatively intact in the hands of Mongolian commanders because of the cemetery of Ali Al-Rezza and Harun al-Rashid (the latter was stolen). Thus the survivors of the massacres migrated to Mashhad. When the Arab traveller Ibn Battuta visited the town in 1333, he reported that it was a large town with abundant fruit trees, streams and mills. A great dome of elegant construction surmounts the noble mausoleum, the walls being decorated with colored tiles.
The most well-known dish cooked in Mashhad, "sholeh Mashhadi" (شله مشهدی) or "Sholeh", dates back to the era of the Mongolian invasion when it is thought to be cooked with any food available (the main ingredients are meat, grains and abundant spices) and be a Mongolian word.

Timurid Empire

It seems that the importance of Sanabad-Mashhad continually increased with the growing fame of its sanctuary and the decline of Tus, which received its death-blow in 1389 from Miran Shah, a son of Timur. When the Mongol noble who governed the place rebelled and attempted to make himself independent, Miran Shah was sent against him by his father. Tus was stormed after a siege of several months, sacked and left a heap of ruins; 10,000 inhabitants were massacred. Those who escaped the holocaust settled in the shelter of the 'Alid sanctuary. Tus was henceforth abandoned and Mashhad took its place as the capital of the district.

Later on, during the reign of the Timurid Shahrukh Mirza, Mashhad became one of the main cities of the realm. In 1418, his wife Goharshad funded the construction of an outstanding mosque beside the shrine, which is known as the Goharshad Mosque. The mosque remains relatively intact to this date, its great size an indicator to the status the city held in the 15th century.

Safavid dynasty
Shah Ismail I, founder of the Safavid dynasty, conquered Mashhad after the death of Husayn Bayqarah and the decline of the Timurid dynasty. He was later captured by the Uzbeks during the reign of Shah Abbas I. In the 16th century the town suffered considerably from the repeated raids of the Özbegs (Uzbeks). In 1507, it was taken by the troops of the Shaybani or Shabani Khan. After two decades, Shah Tahmasp I succeeded in repelling the enemy from the town again in 1528. But in 1544, the Özbegs again succeeded in entering the town and plundering and murdering there. The year 1589 was a disastrous one for Mashhad. The Shaybanid 'Abd al-Mu'min after a four months' siege forced the town to surrender.  Shah Abbas I, who lived in Mashhad from 1585 until his official ascent of the throne in Qazwin in 1587, was not able to retake Mashhad from the Özbegs until 1598. Mashhad was retaken by the Shah Abbas after a long and hard struggle, defeating the Uzbeks in a great battle near Herat as well as managing to drive them beyond the Oxus River. Shah Abbas I wanted to encourage Iranians to go to Mashhad for pilgrimage. He is said to have walked from Isfahan to Mashhad. During the Safavid era, Mashhad gained even more religious recognition, becoming the most important city of Greater Khorasan, as several madrasah and other structures were built beside the Imam Reza shrine. Besides its religious significance, Mashhad has played an important political role as well. The Safavid dynasty has been criticized in a book (Red Shi'sm vs. Black Shi'ism) on the perceived dual aspects of the Shi'a religion throughout history) as a period in which although the dynasty didn't form the idea of Black Shi'ism, but this idea was formed after the defeat of Shah Ismail against the Ottoman leader Sultan Yavuz Selim. Black Shi'ism is a product of the post-Safavid period.

Afsharid dynasty

Mashad saw its greatest glory under Nader Shah, ruler of Iran from 1736 to 1747, and also a great benefactor of the shrine of Imam Reza, who made the city his capital. Nearly the whole eastern part of the kingdom of Nadir Shah passed to foreign rulers in this period of Persian impotence under the rule of the vigorous Ahmad Shah Durrani of the Afghan Durrani Empire. Ahmad defeated the Persians and took Mashhad after an eight-month siege in 1753.  Ahmad Shah and his successor Timur Shah left Shah Rukh in possession of Khurasan as their vassal, making Khurasan a kind of buffer state between them and Persia. As the city's real rulers, however, both these Durrani rulers struck coins in Mashhad. Otherwise, the reign of the blind Shah Rukh, which with repeated short interruptions lasted for nearly half a century, passed without any events of special note. It was only after the death of Timur Shah (1792) that Agha Mohammad Khan Qajar, the founder of the Qajar dynasty, succeeded in taking Shah Rukh's domains and putting him to death in 1795, thus ending the separation of Khurasan from the rest of Persia.

Qajar dynasty

Some believe that Mashhad was ruled by Shahrukh Afshar and remained the capital of the Afsharid dynasty during Zand dynasty until Agha Mohammad Khan Qajar conquered the then larger region of Khorasan in 1796.

1912 Imam Reza shrine bombardment
In 1911 Yusuf Khan of Herat was declared independent in Mashhad as Muhammad Ali Shah and brought together a large group of reactionaries opposed to the revolution, and keep stirring for some time. This gave Russia the excuse to intervene and 29 March 1912 bombed the city; this bombing killed several people and pilgrims; action against a Muslim shrine caused a great shock to all Islamic countries. On 29 March 1912, the sanctuary of Imam Reza was bombed by the Russian artillery fire, causing some damage, including to the golden dome, resulting in a widespread and persisting resentment in the Shiite Muslim world as well as British India. This bombing was orchestrated by Prince Aristid Mikhailovich Dabizha (a Moldovan who was the Russian Consul in Mashhad) and General Radko (a Bulgarian who was commander of the Russian Cossacks in the city). Yusuf Khan ended up captured by the Persians and was executed.

Pahlavi dynasty

Modernization under Reza Shah

The modern development of the city accelerated under Reza Shah (1925-1941). Shah Reza Hospital (currently Imam Reza Hospital, affiliated with the Basij organization) was founded in 1934; the sugar factory of Abkuh in 1935; and the Mashhad University of Medical Sciences in 1939. The city's first power station was installed in 1936, and in 1939, the first urban transport service began with two buses. In this year the first population census was performed, with a result of 76,471 inhabitants.

1935 Imam Reza shrine rebellion

In 1935, a backlash against the modernizing, anti-religious policies of Reza Shah erupted in the Mashhad shrine. Responding to a cleric who denounced the Shah's heretical innovations, corruption, and heavy consumer taxes, many bazaars and villagers took refuge in the shrine, chanted slogans such as "The Shah is a new Yazid." For four days local police and army refused to violate the shrine and the standoff was ended when troops from Azerbaijan arrived and broke into the shrine, killing dozens and injuring hundreds, and marking a final rupture between Shi'ite clergy and the Shah. According to some Mashhadi historians, the Goharshad Mosque uprising, which took place in 1935, is an uprising against Reza Shah's decree banning all veils (headscarf and chador) on 8 January 1936.

1941–1979 reforms

Mashhad experienced population growth after the Anglo-Soviet invasion of Iran in 1941 because of relative insecurity in rural areas, the 1948 drought, and the establishment of Mashhad University in 1949. At the same time, public transport vehicles increased to 77 buses and 200 taxis and the railway link with the capital, Tehran, was established in 1957. The 1956 census reflected a population of 241,989 people. The increase in population continued in the following years thanks to the increase in Iranian oil revenues, the decline of the feudal social model, the agrarian reform of 1963, the founding of the city's airport, the creation of new factories and the development of the health system. In 1966, the population reached 409,616 inhabitants, and 667,770 in 1976.

In 1965 an important urban renewal development project for the surroundings of the shrine of Imam Reza was proposed by the Iranian architect and urban designer Dariush Borbor to replace the dilapidated slum conditions which surrounded the historic monuments. The project was officially approved in 1968. In 1977 the surrounding areas were demolished to make way for the implementation of this project. To relocate the demolished businesses, a new bazaar was designed and constructed in Meydan-e Ab square (in Persian, "میدان آب") by Dariush Borbor. After the revolution, the urban renewal project was abandoned.

1994 Imam Reza shrine bombing
On 20 June 1994, a bomb exploded in a prayer hall of the shrine of the Imam Reza. The bomb that killed at least 25 people on 20 June in Mashhad exploded on Ashura. The Baloch terrorist, Ramzi Yousef, a Sunni Muslim turned Wahhabi, one of the main perpetrators of the 1993 World Trade Center bombing, was found to be behind the plot.

Mashhad after the Revolution
In 1998 and 2003 there were student disturbances after the same events in Tehran.

Geography
The city is located at 36.20º North latitude and 59.35º East longitude, in the valley of the Kashafrud River near Turkmenistan, between the two mountain ranges of Binalood and Hezar Masjed Mountains. The city benefits from the proximity of the mountains, having cool winters, pleasant springs, and mild summers.

The city is the administrative center of Mashhad County (or the Shahrestan of Mashhad) as well as the somewhat smaller district (Bakhsh) of Mashhad. The city itself, excluding parts of the surrounding Bakhsh and Shahrestan, is divided into 13 smaller administrative units, with a total population of more than 3 million.

Climate
Mashhad features a cold semi-arid climate (Köppen BSk) with hot summers and cold winters. Mashhad also has wetter and drier periods with the bulk of the annual precipitation falling between the months of December and May. Summers are typically hot and dry, with high temperatures sometimes exceeding . Winters are typically cool to cold and somewhat damper, with overnight lows routinely dropping below freezing. Mashhad enjoys on average just above 2900 hours of sunshine per year.

Demography

Ethnic groups
The vast majority of Mashhadi people are ethnic Persians, who form the majority of the city's population. Other ethnic groups include Kurdish and Turkmen people who have emigrated recently to the city from the North Khorasan province. There is also a significant community of non-Arabic speakers of Arabian descent who have retained a distinct Arabian culture, cuisine and religious practices.

There are also over 20 million pilgrims who visit the city every year.

Religion

Today, the holy shrine and its museum hold one of the most extensive cultural and artistic treasuries of Iran, in particular manuscript books and paintings. Several important theological schools are associated with the shrine of the Eighth Imam.

The second-largest holy city in the world, Mashhad attracts more than 20 million tourists and pilgrims every year, many of whom come to pay homage to the Imam Reza shrine (the eighth Shi'ite Imam). It has been a magnet for travellers since medieval times. Thus, even as those who complete the pilgrimage to Mecca receive the title of Haji, those who make the pilgrimage to Mashhad—and especially to the Imam Reza shrine—are known as Mashtee, a term employed also of its inhabitants. As an important problem, the duration when new passengers stay in Mashhad has been considerably reduced to 2 days nowadays and they prefer to finish their trip immediately after doing pilgrimage and shopping in the markets. There are about 3000–5000 unauthorized residential units in Mashhad, which, as a unique statistic worldwide, has caused various problems in the city.

Although mainly inhabited by Muslims, there were in the past some religious minorities in Mashhad, mainly Jews who were forcibly converted to Islam in 1839 after the Allahdad incident took place for Mashhadi Jews in 1839. They became known as Jadid al-Islam ("Newcomers in Islam"). On the outside, they adapted to the Islamic way of life, but often secretly kept their faith and traditions.

Economy

Mashhad is Iran's second largest automobile production hub. The city's economy is based mainly on dry fruits, salted nuts, saffron, Iranian sweets like gaz and sohaan, precious stones like agates, turquoise, intricately designed silver jewelry studded with rubies and emeralds, eighteen carat gold jewelry, perfumes, religious souvenirs, trench coats, scarves, termeh, carpets, and rugs.

According to the writings and documents, the oldest existing carpet attributed to the city belongs to the reign of Shah Abbas (Abbas I of Persia). Also, there is a type of carpet, classified as Mashhad Turkbâf, which, as its name suggests, is woven by hand with Turkish knots by craftsmen who emigrated from Tabriz to Mashhad in the nineteenth century. Among other major industries in the city are the nutrition, clothing, leather, textiles, chemical, steel, metallic, and non-metallic mineral industries, construction materials factories, & the handicraft industry.

With more than 55% of all the hotels in Iran, Mashhad is the hub of tourism in the country. Religious shrines are the most powerful attractions for foreign travelers; every year, 20 to 30 million pilgrims from Iran and more than 2 million pilgrims and tourists from elsewhere around the world come to Mashhad. Mashhad is one of the main producers of leather products in the region.

Unemployment, poverty, drug addiction, theft, and sexual exploitation are the most important social problems of the city.

The divorce rate in Mashhad had increased by 35 percent by 2014. Khorasan and Mashhad ranked the second in violence across the country in 2013.

Astan Quds Razavi
At the same time, the city has kept its character as a goal of pilgrimage, dominated by the strength of the economic and political authority of the Astan Quds Razavi, the administration of the Shrine waqf, probably the most important in the Muslim world and the largest active bonyad in Iran. The Astan Quds Razavi is a major player in the economy of the city of Mashhad. The land occupied by the shrine has grown fourfold since 1979 according to the head of the foundation's international relations department. The Shrine of Imam Reza is vaster than Vatican City. The foundation owns most of the real estate in Mashhad and rents out shop space to bazaaris and hoteliers. The main resource of the institution is endowments, estimated to have annual revenue of $210 billion. Ahmad Marvi is the current Custodian of Astan Quds Razavi.

Padideh Shandiz

Padideh Shandiz International Tourism Development Company, an Iranian private joint-stock holding company, behaves like a public company by selling stocks despite being a joint-stock in the field of restaurants, tourism and construction, with a football club (Padideh F.C.; formerly named Azadegan League club Mes Sarcheshmeh). In January 2015, the company was accused of a "fraud" worth $34.3 billion, which is one eighth of Iran budget.

Credit institutions
Several credit institutions have been established in Mashhad, including Samenolhojaj, Samenola'emmeh and Melal (formerly Askariye). The depositors of the first institution have faced problem in receiving cash from the institution.

Others
The city's International Exhibition Center is the second most active exhibition center after Tehran, which due to proximity to Central Asian countries hosts dozens of international exhibitions each year. Companies such as Smart-innovators in Mashhad are pioneers in electrical and computer technology.

Language
The language mainly spoken in Mashhad is Persian with a variating Mashhadi accent, which can at times, prove itself as a sort of dialect. The Mashhadi Persian dialect is somewhat different from the standard Persian dialect in some of its tones and stresses. Today, the Mashhadi dialect is rarely spoken by young people of Mashhad, most of them perceive it as a humiliation. This is thought to be related to the non-positive performance of the Islamic Republic of Iran Broadcasting (IRIB).

Culture

Religious seminaries

Long a center of secular and religious learning, Mashhad has been a center for the Islamic arts and sciences as well as piety and pilgrimage. Mashhad was an educational centre, with a considerable number of Islamic schools (madrasas, the majority of them, however, dating from the later Safavid period. Mashhad Hawza (Persian: حوزه علمیه مشهد) is one of the largest seminaries of traditional Islamic school of higher learning in Mashhad, which was headed by Abbas Vaez-Tabasi (who was Chairman of the Astan Quds Razavi board from 1979) after the revolution and in which Iranian politician and clerics such as Ali Khamenei, Ahmad Alamolhoda, Abolghasem Khazali, Mohammad Reyshahri, Morteza Motahhari, Abbas Vaez-Tabasi, Madmoud Halabi (the founder of Hojjatieh and Mohammad Hadi Abd-e Khodaee learned Islamic studies. The number of seminary schools in Mashhad is now thirty nine and there are an estimated 2300 seminarians in the city.

The Ferdowsi University of Mashhad, named after the great Iranian poet, is located here and is regarded as the third institution in attracting foreign students, mainly from Lebanon, Syria, Yemen, Bahrain, Central Asian republics. The Madrassa of Ayatollah Al-Khoei, originally built in the seventeenth century and recently replaced with modern facilities, is the city's foremost traditional centre for religious learning. The Razavi University of Islamic Sciences, founded in 1984, stands at the centre of town, within the shrine complex. The prestige of traditional religious education at Mashhad attracts students, known as Talabeh, or "Mollah" internationally.

Mashhad is also home to one of the oldest libraries of the Middle-East called the Central Library of Astan Quds Razavi with a history of over six centuries. There are some six million historical documents in the foundation's central library. A museum is also home to over 70,000 rare manuscripts from various historical eras.

The Astan Quds Razavi Central Museum, which is part of the Astan-e Quds Razavi Complex, contains Islamic art and historical artifacts. In 1976, a new edifice was designed and constructed by the well-known Iranian architect Dariush Borbor to house the museum and the ancient manuscripts.

In 1569 (977 H), 'Imad al-Din Mas'ud Shirazi, a physician at the Mashhad hospital, wrote the earliest Islamic treatise on syphilis, one influenced by European medical thought. Kashmar rug is a type of Persian rug indigenous to this region.

Mashhad active galleries include: Mirak Gallery, Parse Gallery, Rezvan Gallery, Soroush Gallery, and the Narvan Gallery.

During the recent years, Mashhad has been a clerical base to monitor the affairs and decisions of state. In 2015, Mashhad's clerics publicly criticized the performance of concert in Mashhad, which led to the order of cancellation of concerts in the city by Ali Jannati, the minister of culture, and then his resignation on 19 October 2016.

Newspapers
There are two influential newspapers in Mashhad, Khorasan (خراسان) and Qods (قدس), which have been considered "conservative newspapers". They are two Mashhad-based daily published by and representing the views of their current and old owners: Foundation of Martyrs and Veterans Affairs and Astan Quds Razavi, respectively.

Capital of Islamic culture
The Islamic Educational, Scientific and Cultural Organization named Mashhad 2017's "cultural capital of the Muslim world" in Asia on 24 January 2017. Several international events especially entrepreneurs networking event entitled Entrepreneurs Show 2017 was organized by CODE International in collaboration with Ferdowsi University of Mashhad, Khorasan Science and Technology Park and city district government of Mashhad.

Main sites

Apart from Imam Reza shrine, there are a number of large parks, the tombs of historical celebrities in nearby Tus and Nishapur, the tomb of Nader Shah and Koohsangi park. The Koohestan Park-e-Shadi Complex includes a zoo, where many wild animals are kept and which attracts many visitors to Mashhad. It is also home to the Mashhad Airbase (formerly Imam Reza airbase), jointly a military installation housing Mirage aircraft, and a civilian international airport.

(The three were all disciples of Imam Reza).

Among the other sights are the tomb of the poet Ferdowsi in Tus,  distance, and the summer resorts at Torghabeh, Torogh, Akhlamad, Zoshk, and Shandiz.

The Shah Public Bath, built during the Safavid era in 1648, is an outstanding example of the architecture of that period. It was recently restored, and is to be turned into a museum.

Transportation

Airport
Mashhad is served by the Mashhad International Airport, which handles domestic flights to Iranian cities and international flights, mostly to neighbouring Arab countries. The airport is the country's second busiest after Tehran Mehrabad Airport and above Tehran's Imam Khomeini International Airport.

It is connected to 57 destinations and has frequent flights to 30 cities within Iran and 27 destinations in the Central Asia, the Middle East, East Asia and Europe.

The airport has been under a US$45.7 ml vast expansion project which has been finished by opening a new Haj Terminal with 10,000 m area on 24 May 2010 and followed by opening a new international terminal with 30000 m2 area with a new parking building, a new custom storage and cargo terminal, new safety and fire fighting buildings and upgrades to taxiways and equipment. Another USD26.5 ml development project for construction of new hangar for aircraft repair facilities and expansion of the west side of the domestic terminal is underway using a BOT contract with the private sector.

Metro

Mashhad Urban Railway Corporation (MURCO) is constructing metro and light rail system for the city of Mashhad which includes four lines with  length.  Mashhad Urban Railway Operation Company (MUROC) is responsible for the operation of the lines.  The LRT line has been operational since 21 February 2011 with  length and 22 stations and is connected to Mashhad International Airport from early 2016. The total length of line 1 is 24 kilometers and has 24 stations. the current headway in peak hours is 4.5 minutes.
    The second line which is a metro line with 14.5  km length and 13 stations. line 2 construction is going to finish in early 2020.  The first phase of line 2 with 8 kilometers and 7 stations is started on 21 February 2017. On 20 March two stations were added to the network in test operational mode and the first interchange station was added to the network. On 7 May 2018, Iranian President Hassan Rouhani took part in the inauguration ceremony of the first Mashhad Urban Railway interchange station "Shariati" which connects line 1 and 2. in 27 July shahid Kaveh station operation began and the length of the operational part of line 2 reached to 13.5 kilometers. On 18 November 2019 Alandasht station Began operative. Currently, line 2 operates every day with 13.5 km and 11 stations from 6 am to 10 pm, and the current headway is 10 minutes. Currently Mashhad Urban Railway Operation Company (MUROC) operates 2 lines with 37.5 kilometers length and 35 stations. Tunnel excavation of line 3 has begun and more than 14 kilometers of tunnel excavation is done using two Tunnel Boring Machines and operation of the first phase of line 3 is expected to start in 2021. Tunnel Excavation of line 4 is going to start in summer 2019.

Rail
Mashhad railway station has Local, Regional, InterRegio, InterRegio-Express services. The station is owned by IRI Railways and has daily services from most parts of the country, plus two suburban services. The building was designed by Heydar Ghiai. Mashhad is connected to three major rail lines: Tehran-Mashhad, Mashhad-Bafq (running south), and Mashhad-Sarakhs at the border with Turkmenistan. Some freight trains continue from Sarakhs towards Uzbekistan and to Kazakhstan, but have to change bogies because of the difference in Rail gauge. Cargo and passenger rail services are provided or operated by RAJA Rail Transportation Co., Joopar Co., Fadak Trains Co.
 
A new service from Nakhchivan, Azerbaijan to Mashad, Iran was launched in December 2016.

Road
Road 95 links Mashhad south to Torbat-e Heydarieh and Birjand. Road 44 goes west towards Shahrud and Tehran. Road 22 travels northwest towards Bojnurd. Ashgabat in Turkmenistan is 220 km away and is accessible via Road 22 (AH78).

Bus

Government and politics

Members of Parliament
Mashhad's current members of parliament are described as politicians with fundamentalist conservative tendencies, who are mostly the members of Front of Islamic Revolution Stability, an Iranian principlist political group. They were elected to the Parliament on 26 February 2016.

Members of Assembly of Experts
Mahmoud Hashemi Shahroudi and Ahmad Alamolhoda are two members of the Iranian Assembly of Experts from Mashhad. Hashemi Shahroudi is currently First Vice-chairman of the Iranian Assembly of Experts. He was the Head of Iran's Judiciary from 1999 until 2009 who upon accepting his position, appointed Saeed Mortazavi, a well known fundamentalist and controversial figure during President Mahmud Ahmadinejad's reelection, prosecutor general of Iran. He was supported by Mashhad's reformists as the candidate of the Fifth Assembly on 26 February 2016.

City Council and mayor

In 2013, an Iranian principlist political group, Front of Islamic Revolution Stability (which is partly made up of former ministers of Mahmoud Ahmadinejad and Mohammad Taghi Mesbah Yazdi), gained a landslide victory in Mashhad City Council, which on 23 September 2013, elected Seyed Sowlat Mortazavi as mayor, who was former governor of the province of South Khorasan and the city of Birjand. The municipality's budget amounted to 9600 billion Toman in 2015.

Universities and colleges
Universities
 Ferdowsi University of Mashhad
 Ferdowsi University of Mashhad – International Campus
 Golbahar University of Science and New Technology
 Imam Reza International University 
 Islamic Azad University of Khorasan – Golbahar International Campus
 Islamic Azad University of Mashhad
 Khayyam University
  
 Payame Noor University of Mashhad
 Razavi University of Islamic Sciences
 
 Sama Technical and Vocational Training Center (Islamic Azad University of Mashhad)
 Sport Sciences Research Institute of Iran

Colleges
 Al Mustafa International University
 
 Arman Razavi Girls Institute of Higher Education
 Asrar Institute of Higher Education
 Attar Institute of Higher Education
 Bahar Institute of Higher Education
 Binalood Institute of Higher Education
 Cultural Heritage, Hand Crafts, and Tourism Higher Education Center (University of Science and Technology)
 Eqbal Lahoori Institute of Higher Education
 
 Hakim Toos Institute of Higher Education
 Hekmat Razavi Institute of Higher Education
 Iranian Academic Center for Education, Culture and Research, Mashhad Branch (Jahad Daneshgahi of Mashhad)
 Jahad Keshavarzi Higher Education Center of Khorasan Razavi (Shahid Hashemi Nejad) 
 Kavian Institute of Higher Education
 Kharazmi Azad Institute of Higher Education of Khorasan 
 Khavaran Institute of Higher Education
 Kheradgarayan Motahar Institute of higher education
 Khorasan Institute of Higher Education
 Khorasan Razavi Judiciary Center (University of Science and Technology)
 Khorasan Razavi Municipalities' Institute of Research, Education, and Consultation of (University of Science and Technology)
 Mashhad Aviation Industry Center (University of Science and Technology)
 Mashhad Aviation Training Center (University of Science and Technology)
 Mashhad Culture and Art Center 1 (University of Science and Technology)
 Mashhad Koran Reciters Society
 Mashhad Prisons Organization Center (University of Science and Technology)
 Mashhad Tax center (University of Science and Technology)
 Navvab Higher Clerical School
 Part Tyre Center (University of Science and Technology)
 Red Crescent Society of Khorasan Razavi (University of Science and Technology)
 Salman Institute of Higher Education
 Samen Teacher Training Center of Mashhad (Farhangian University) 
 Samen Training Center of Mashhad (Technical and Vocational University)
 Sanabad Golbahar Institute of Higher Education
 Shahid Beheshti Teacher Training College (Farhangian University) 
 Shahid Hashemi Nejad Teacher Training College (Farhangian University) 
 
 
 Shandiz Institute of Higher Education
 Khorasan Razavi Taavon Center (University of Science and Technology)
 Tabaran Institute of Higher Education
 Toos Institute of Higher Education
 Toos Porcelain Center (University of Science and Technology)
 
 Khorasan Water and Electricity Industry Center (University of Science and Technology)
 Workers' House; Mashhad Branch (University of Science and Technology)

Sports

Major sport teams

Other sports

City was host to 2009 Junior World Championships in sitting volleyball where Iran's junior team won Gold.

Wrestling is one of the most popular sports in this city. Pahlevani and zoorkhaneh rituals have a special place in Mashhad and is one of the most important zoorkhaneh in Iran in Mashhad.

Mashhad cycling track was introduced in 2011 as the most equipped cycling track in Iran; Car racing track, motorcycle track and motocross track, three skating rinks, ski track and equestrian track in Mashhad are other sports tracks in Mashhad. The first golf course in Iran is located in the Samen complex of Mashhad.

Gallery

Mashhad as capital of Persia and independent Khorasan
The following Shahanshahs had Mashhad as their capital:

 Kianid Dynasty
 Malek Mahmoud Sistani 1722–1726
 Afsharid dynasty
 Nader Shah
 Adil Shah
 Ebrahim Afshar
 Shahrukh Afshar
 Nadir Mirza of Khorasan
 Safavid dynasty
 Soleyman II
 Autonomous Government of Khorasan
 Colonel Mohammad Taghi Khan Pessyan

Notable people from Mashhad and Toos

Artists

Music

Cinema

 25band, both singers born in Mashhad; Pop Group formed in 2010
 Abdi Behravanfar, born June 1975 in Mashhad; an Iranian Singer, guitar player and singer-songwriter 
 Ali "Dubfire" Shirazinia, born 19 April 1971; musician/dj (co-founder of Deep Dish)
 Amir Ghavidel, March 1947 – November 2009; an Iranian director and script writer
 Anoushirvan Arjmand, Iranian actor
 Borzoo Arjmand, born 1975 in Mashhad; Iranian Cinema, Theatre, and Television actor
 Dariush Arjmand, Iranian actor
 Darya Dadvar, born 1971 in Mashhad; an accomplished Iranian soprano soloist and composer
 Hamed Behdad, born 17 November 1973 in Mashhad; Iranian actor
 Hamid Motebassem, born 1958 in Mashhad; Iranian musician and tar and setar player
 Hosein Eblis is considered one of pioneers of "Persian Rap" along with Hichkas and Reza Pishro
 Homayoun Shajarian, Mohammad-Reza Shajarian's son, born 21 May 1975; renowned Persian classical music vocalist, as well as a Tombak and Kamancheh player
 Iran Darroudi, born 2 September 1936 in Mashhad; Iranian artist
 Javad Jalali, born 30 May 1977 in Mashhad; Iranian Photographer and Cinematographer
 Mahdi Bemani Naeini, born 3 November 1968; Iranian film director, cinematographer, TV cameraman and photographer
 Marshall Manesh, born 16 August 1950 in Mashhad; Iranian-American actor
 Mitra Hajjar, born 4 February 1977; Iranian actress
 Mohammad-Reza Shajarian, born 23 September 1940 in Mashhad; internationally and critically acclaimed Persian traditional singer, composer and Master (Ostad) of Persian music
 Mohsen Namjoo, born 1976 in Torbat-e-Jaam; Iranian singer-songwriter, author, musician, and setar player
 Navid Negahban, born 2 June 1968 in Mashhad; Iranian-American actor
 Noureddin Zarrinkelk, born 1937 in Mashhad; renowned Iranian animator, concept artist, editor, graphic designer, illustrator, layout artist, photographer, script writer and sculptor
 Ovanes Ohanian, ?–1961 Tehran; Armenian-Iranian filmmaker who established the first film school in Iran
 Pouran Jinchi, born 1959 in Mashhad; Iranian-American artist
 Rafi Pitts, born 1967 in Mashhad; internationally acclaimed Iranian film director
 Reza Attaran, born 31 March 1968 in Mashhad; Iranian actor and director
 Reza Kianian, born 17 July 1951 in Mashhad; Iranian actor
 Shahin Ebrahimzadeh-Pezeshki, born 1958 in Mashhad; Persian textile and costume art historian, historian of tribal costumes, textile artist, author, researcher, and curator

Entrepreneurs

 Anousheh Ansari, born 12 September 1966; the Iranian-American co-founder and chairman of Prodea Systems, Inc and a spaceflight participant with the Russian space program
 Hossein Sabet, Iranian businessman and Persian carpet dealer who owns Sabet International Trading Co.
 Mahmoud Khayami, born 1930 in Mashhad, Iran; Iranian born industrialist and philanthropist, of French nationality

Sports

 Abbas Chamanyan, Iranian football coach, manager, and former player
 Abbas Golmakani, World's wrestling champion during the 1950s
 Abolfazl Safavi, Iran professional football player for Aboumoslem team in Takhte Jamshid League; He was later executed in prison by the Iranian regime in 1982 for his affiliation with Iranian opposition, the MEK
 Ali Baghbanbashi, athlete
 Alireza Vahedi Nikbakht, born 30 June 1980 in Mashhad; Iranian professional football player
 Amir Ghaseminejad, judoka
 Amir Reza Khadem, born 10 February 1970 in Mashhad, wrestler
 Amir Tavakkolian, wrestler
 Farbod Farman, basketballer
 Farhad Zarif, born 3 March 1983, Volleyballer
 Ghodrat Bahadori, Iranian Futsaler/Indoor soccer player
 Hamed Afagh, basketballer
 Hamid Reza Mobarez, swimmer
 Hasan Kamranifar, Iranian football referee
 Heshmat Mohajerani, born January 1936 in Mashhad, Iran; Iranian football coach, manager, and former player
 Hossein Badamaki, Iranian professional football player
 Hossein Ghadam, Iran professional football player for Aboumoslem team
 Hossein Sokhandan, Iranian football referee
 Hossein Tayyebi, Iranian Futsaler/Indoor soccer player
 Javad Mahjoub, judoka
 Khodadad Azizi, born 22 June 1971 in Mashhad, Iran; retired professional football striker
 Kia Zolgharnain, Iranian-American former Futsaler/Indoor soccer player 
 Mahdi Javid, Iranian Futsaler/Indoor soccer player
 Majid Khodaei, wrestler
 Maryam Sedarati, athlete, Iran record holder in women high jump for three decades
 Masoud Haji Akhondzadeh, judoka
 Mohammad Khadem, wrestler
 Mohammad Mansouri, Iranian professional football player
 Mohsen Ghahramani, Iranian football referee
 Mohsen Torki, Iranian football referee
 Rasoul Khadem, born 17 February 1972 in Mashhad, wrestler
 Reza Enayati, Iranian professional football player
 Reza Ghoochannejhad, Iranian-Dutch professional football player 
 Rouzbeh Arghavan, basketballer

Religious and political figures

 Abbas Vaez-Tabasi, 25 June 1935 – 4 March 2016; Grand Imam and Chairman of the Astan Quds Razavi board 
 Abdolreza Rahmani Fazli, born 1959 in Shirvan; Interior Minister of President Hassan Rouhani
 Abu Muslim Khorasani, c. 700–755; Abu Muslim Abd al-Rahman ibn Muslim al-Khorasani, Abbasid general of Persian origin
 Al-Ghazali, 1058–1111; Islamic theologian, jurist, philosopher, cosmologist, psychologist and mystic of Persian origin
 Al-Hurr al-Aamili, Shia scholar and muhaddith
 Ali al-Sistani, born approximately August 4, 1930; Twelver Shi'a marja residing in Iraq since 1951
 Ebrahim Raisi, b. 1960; scholar and President-elect of Iran
 Goharshad Begum, Persian noble and wife of Shāh Rukh, the emperor of the Timurid dynasty of Herāt
 Hadi Khamenei, b. 1947; mid-ranking cleric who is a member of the reformist Association of Combatant Clerics
 Hassan Ghazizadeh Hashemi, born 21 March 1959 in Fariman; Minister of Health and Medical Education of President Hassan Rouhani
 Hassan Rahimpour Azghadi, Conservative political strategist and television personality in the Islamic Republic of Iran
 Hossein Vahid Khorasani, born in 1924; Iranian Twelver Shi'a Marja
 Mohammad-Ali Abtahi, born January 27, 1958; former Vice President of Iran and a close associate of former reformist President Khatami
 Mohammad Bagher Ghalibaf, born 23 August 1961 in Torghabeh, near Mashhad; the former Mayor of Tehran and current Speaker of Parliament
 Mohammad-Kazem Khorasani, 1839–1911; Twelver Shi'a Marja, Persian (Iranian) politician, philosopher, reformer
 Morteza Motahhari, 31 January 1919 in Fariman – 1 May 1979; an Iranian cleric, philosopher, lecturer, and politician
 Nasir al-Din al-Tusi, born February 1201 in Tūs, Khorasan – 26 June 1274 in al-Kāżimiyyah near Baghdad; Persian of the Ismaili and subsequently Twelver Shī'ah Islamic belief
 Nizam al-Mulk, 1018 – 14 October 1092; celebrated Persian scholar and vizier of the Seljuq Empire
 Saeed Jalili, born 1965 in Mashhad; Iranian politician and the former present secretary of Iran's Supreme National Security Council
 Seyed Hassan Firuzabadi, current major general, Islamic Republic of Iran
 Seyyed Ali Khamenei, born 17 July 1939; former president and current supreme leader of Iran
 Shahrukh (Timurid dynasty), August 20, 1377 – March 12, 1447; ruler of the eastern portion of the empire established by the Central Asian warlord Timur (Tamerlane)
 Shaykh Tusi, 385–460 A.H.; prominent Persian scholar of the Shi'a Twelver Islamic belief 
 Sheikh Ali Tehrani, brother-in-law of Seyyed Ali Khamenei, currently living in Iran. He is one of the oppositions of current Iranian government.

Pahlavic politicians

 Abdolhossein Teymourtash, prominent Iraninan statesman and first minister of justice under the Pahlavis
 Amirteymour Kalali, prominent Iraninan statesman
 Manouchehr Eghbal, 14 October 1909 – 25 November 1977, a Prime Minister of Iran

Science & scientists

 Abū al-Wafā' Būzjānī, 10 June 940 – 1 July 998; Persian mathematician and astronomer
 Abū Ja'far al-Khāzin, 900–971; Persian astronomer and mathematician from Khorasan
 Jābir ibn Hayyān, c. 721 in Tus – c. 815 in Kufa; prominent polymath, a chemist and alchemist, astronomer and astrologer, engineer, geographer, philosopher, physicist, and pharmacist and physician
 Nasir al-Din al-Tusi, born February 1201 in Tūs, Khorasan – 26 June 1274 in al-Kāżimiyyah near Baghdad; Persian of the Ismaili and subsequently Twelver Shī'ah Islamic belief
 Sharaf al-Dīn al-Ṭūsī, 1135–1213; Persian mathematician and astronomer of the Islamic Golden Age (during the Middle Ages)
 Mohsen Baqerzada, Publisher and manager of Toos publication

Writers and literatures

 Abolfazl Beyhaqi, 995–1077; a Persian historian and author
 Ali Akbar Fayyaz, a renowned historian of early Islam and literary critic, founder of the School of Letters and Humanities at the Ferdowsi University of Mashhad
 Abu-Mansur Daqiqi, 935/942–976/980
 Abusa'id Abolkhayr, 7 December 967 – 12 January 1049 / Muharram ul Haram 1, 357 – Sha'aban 4, 440 AH; a Persian Sufi who contributed extensively to the evolution of Sufi tradition
 Anvari, 1126–1189, one of the greatest Persian poets
 Asadi Tusi, born in Tus, Iranian province of Khorasan, died 1072 Tabriz, Iran; Persian poet of Iranian national epics
 Ferdowsi, 935–1020 in Tus; a Persian poet
 Mehdi Akhavan-Sales, 1928, Mashhad, Iran – 1990, Tehran, Iran; a Persian poet
 Mohammad Mokhtari (writer), Iranian writer who was murdered on the outskirts of Tehran in the course of the Chain Murders of Iran.
 Mohammad-Taghi Bahar, 6 November 1884, Mashhad, Iran – 22 April 1951; Tehran, Iran

Twin towns – sister cities

Mashhad is twinned with:

 Karachi, Pakistan
 Karbala, Iraq
 Kuala Lumpur, Malaysia
 Lahore, Pakistan
 Mazar-i-Sharif, Afghanistan
 Najaf, Iraq
 Ürümqi, China

Consulates

Active
  (1996–)
  (1975–)
  (1919–?,1930–?, 2014–)
  (1995–)

Former
  (1889–1975)
  (1889–1917)
  (1917–1937, 1941–1979)
  (1941–?)
  (1949–1979)
  Poland
 
 
 
 
  (c. 1984)
  (1995–2009)
  (2004–2016)

See also

 The National Library of Astan Quds Razavi
 Mashadi Jewish Community
 Sport Sciences Research Institute of Iran

Footnotes

References

External links

 Municipality of Mashhad Official website (in Persian)
 Astan Quds Razavi
  Mashhad Portal Official website (in Persian)

 
Mashhad

Populated places in Mashhad County
Cities in Razavi Khorasan Province
Iranian provincial capitals
Former capitals of Iran
Populated places along the Silk Road
Shia holy cities
Cities founded by Alexander the Great